FC Tytan Armiansk was a football club based in Armiansk, Autonomous Republic of Crimea. The club last played in the Persha Liha during the 2013–14 season. The club was dissolved due to the annexation of Crimea by the Russian Federation.

Colors are (Home) gold shirts, black shorts. (Away) white shirts, black shorts.

History
The first official name the team received was Stroitel (The Builder) in 1969, although, the team already existed and participated in the regional competitions since 1964, but without a real name. The team began to play its games on some quickly cleared up area for a football(soccer) field. Simultaneously, the construction of a new stadium started as well. The main and only sponsor of the team was a local chemical plant, the director (Vsevolod Stepanov) of which decided to change the name for the team to "Tytan" in 1973. The name was introduced to symbolize the power, in sport as well, of the real giant of chemical industry in the whole southern region of the country. In 1974 the team entered a semi-professional competition. In the same year "Tytan" received at its exploitation a new stadium, "Khimik" (5000 seats). And in 1975 the new unofficial club was founded with its own headquarters and stadium, which included three playing fields and its own swimming pool. The first club president was Stepanov Vsevolod Mykolayovich. The first stadium director became Kohut Ivan Dmytrovich. The first team manager was Basov Herman Nizamovich. The first match at the "Khimik" stadium took place on the Victory Day of 1975 (9 May 1975) "FC Tytan Armiansk"-"Tavriya Simferopol" 2:2 (2 goals for "Tytan" were scored by Anatolij Lebid).

Honours
 Ukrainian Second League (3rd Tier)
  2009–10

 Ukrainian Amateur Cup
  1977

 Crimea championship (Soviet/Ukrainian Lower Tier)
  1975, 1976, 1977, 1978, 1979, 1980, 1981, 1983, 1984, 1986, 1988, 1990 (12×)

 Crimean Cup 
  1976, 1977, 1978, 1979, 1981, 1985, 1987, 1989, 1990 (9×)

League and cup history

Soviet Union

Ukraine

{|class="wikitable"
|-bgcolor="#efefef"
! Season
! Div.
! Pos.
! Pl.
! W
! D
! L
! GS
! GA
! P
!Domestic Cup
!colspan=2|Europe
!Notes
|-
|align=center|1992
|align=center|3rd "B"
|align=center bgcolor=silver|2
|align=center|16
|align=center|8
|align=center|5
|align=center|3
|align=center|19
|align=center|10
|align=center|21
|align=center|Did not qualify
|align=center|
|align=center|
|align=center|
|-
|align=center|1992–93
|align=center|3rd
|align=center|17
|align=center|34
|align=center|10
|align=center|6
|align=center|18
|align=center|42
|align=center|54
|align=center|26
|align=center|1/64 finals
|align=center|
|align=center|
|align=center|
|-
|align=center|1993–94
|align=center|3rd
|align=center|14
|align=center|42
|align=center|13
|align=center|12
|align=center|17
|align=center|47
|align=center|38
|align=center|38
|align=center|1/64 finals
|align=center|
|align=center|
|align=center|
|-
|align=center|1994–95
|align=center|3rd
|align=center|6
|align=center|42
|align=center|22
|align=center|10
|align=center|10
|align=center|68
|align=center|36
|align=center|76
|align=center|1/32 finals
|align=center|
|align=center|
|align=center|
|-
|align=center|1995–96
|align=center|3rd "B"
|align=center|6
|align=center|38
|align=center|19
|align=center|10
|align=center|9
|align=center|59
|align=center|38
|align=center|67
|align=center|1/64 finals
|align=center|
|align=center|
|align=center|
|-
|align=center|1996–97
|align=center|3rd "B"
|align=center bgcolor=silver|2
|align=center|32
|align=center|17
|align=center|6
|align=center|7
|align=center|51
|align=center|29
|align=center|57
|align=center|1/64 finals
|align=center|
|align=center|
|align=center|
|-
|align=center|1997–98
|align=center|3rd "B"
|align=center|8
|align=center|34
|align=center|11
|align=center|9
|align=center|12
|align=center|36
|align=center|36
|align=center|42
|align=center|1/32 finals
|align=center|
|align=center|
|align=center|
|-
|align=center|1998–99
|align=center|3rd "B"
|align=center|9
|align=center|26
|align=center|10
|align=center|6
|align=center|10
|align=center|31
|align=center|38
|align=center|36
|align=center|1/64 finals
|align=center|
|align=center|
|align=center|
|-
|align=center|1999-00
|align=center|3rd "B"
|align=center|6
|align=center|26
|align=center|11
|align=center|4
|align=center|11
|align=center|30
|align=center|34
|align=center|37
|align=center|1/8 finals Second League Cup
|align=center|
|align=center|
|align=center|
|-
|align=center|2000–01
|align=center|3rd "B"
|align=center|4
|align=center|28
|align=center|14
|align=center|8
|align=center|6
|align=center|38
|align=center|21
|align=center|50
|align=center|1/16 finals forfeit
|align=center|
|align=center|
|align=center|
|-
|align=center|2001–02
|align=center|3rd "B"
|align=center|13
|align=center|34
|align=center|10
|align=center|10
|align=center|14
|align=center|32
|align=center|42
|align=center|40
|align=center|1/64 finals
|align=center|
|align=center|
|align=center|
|-
|align=center|2002–03
|align=center|3rd "B"
|align=center|12
|align=center|30
|align=center|8
|align=center|5
|align=center|17
|align=center|30
|align=center|48
|align=center|29
|align=center|1/32 finals
|align=center|
|align=center|
|align=center|
|-
|align=center|2003–04
|align=center|3rd "B"
|align=center|9
|align=center|30
|align=center|10
|align=center|10
|align=center|10
|align=center|31
|align=center|31
|align=center|40
|align=center|1/16 finals
|align=center|
|align=center|
|align=center|
|-
|align=center|2004–05
|align=center|3rd "B"
|align=center|4
|align=center|26
|align=center|13
|align=center|5
|align=center|8
|align=center|44
|align=center|32
|align=center|44
|align=center|1/32 finals
|align=center|
|align=center|
|align=center|
|-
|align=center|2005–06
|align=center|3rd "B"
|align=center|10
|align=center|28
|align=center|8
|align=center|9
|align=center|11
|align=center|33
|align=center|39
|align=center|33
|align=center|1/32 finals
|align=center|
|align=center|
|align=center|
|-
|align=center|2006–07
|align=center|3rd "B"
|align=center bgcolor=tan|3
|align=center|28
|align=center|16
|align=center|8
|align=center|4
|align=center|48
|align=center|21
|align=center|56
|align=center|1/8 finals
|align=center|
|align=center|
|align=center|
|-
|align=center|2007–08
|align=center|3rd "B"
|align=center bgcolor=silver|2
|align=center|34
|align=center|22
|align=center|5
|align=center|7
|align=center|74
|align=center|39
|align=center|71
|align=center|1/16 finals
|align=center|
|align=center|
|align=center|
|-
|align=center|2008–09
|align=center|3rd "B"
|align=center|4
|align=center|34
|align=center|19
|align=center|7
|align=center|8
|align=center|55
|align=center|31
|align=center|64
|align=center|1/64 finals
|align=center|
|align=center|
|align=center|
|-
|align=center|2009–10
|align=center|3rd "B"
|align=center bgcolor=gold|1
|align=center|26
|align=center|21
|align=center|3
|align=center|2
|align=center|50
|align=center|20
|align=center|66
|align=center|1/32 finals
|align=center|
|align=center|
|align=center bgcolor=green|Promoted
|-
|align=center|2010–11
|align=center|2nd
|align=center|11
|align=center|34
|align=center|13
|align=center|5
|align=center|16
|align=center|32
|align=center|42
|align=center|44
|align=center|1/16 finals
|align=center|
|align=center|
|align=center|
|-
|align=center|2011–12
|align=center|2nd
|align=center|14
|align=center|34
|align=center|9
|align=center|5
|align=center|20
|align=center|33
|align=center|59
|align=center|32
|align=center|1/16 finals
|align=center|
|align=center|
|align=center| 
|-
|align=center|2012–13
|align=center|2nd
|align=center|12
|align=center|34 	
|align=center|13 	
|align=center|9 	
|align=center|12 	
|align=center|44 	
|align=center|40 	
|align=center|48
|align=center|1/32 finals
|align=center|
|align=center|
|align=center|
|-
|align=center|2013–14
|align=center|2nd
|align=center|13
|align=center|29
|align=center|9
|align=center|8
|align=center|12
|align=center|32
|align=center|41
|align=center|35
|align=center|1/32 finals
|align=center|
|align=center|
|align=center bgcolor=red|Dissolved
|}

Coaches

Notes

References

External links
FC Tytan official site 

 
Tytan
Football clubs in the Ukrainian Soviet Socialist Republic
Association football clubs established in 1969
Association football clubs disestablished in 2014
1969 establishments in Ukraine
2014 disestablishments in Ukraine